The 1996 ITU Triathlon World Championships was a triathlon event held in Cleveland, Ohio, United States on 24 August 1996, organised by the International Triathlon Union. The championship was won by Simon Lessing of Great Britain and Jackie Gallagher of Australia. The course was a  swim,  bike,  run.

Results

Men's Championship

Women's Championship

Junior men

Junior women

References

World Triathlon Series
International sports competitions hosted by the United States
World Championships
ITU Triathlon World Championships
ITU Triathlon
Sports competitions in Cleveland
Triathlon competitions in the United States